Chester Gore (1893–1966) was an American art director. He worked on more than fifty films during his career. At Twentieth Century Fox he worked on series films such as Charlie Chan, Mr. Moto and the Jones Family.

Selected filmography
 Charlie Chan at the Olympics (1937)
 Love on a Budget (1938)
 Mr. Moto on Danger Island (1939)
 The Honeymoon's Over (1939)
 News Is Made at Night (1939)
 Charlie Chan in Panama (1940)
 Charlie Chan's Murder Cruise (1940)
 Father Was a Fullback (1949)
 Two Flags West (1950)
 MacDonald of the Canadian Mounties (1952)

References

Bibliography
 Stephens, Michael L. Art Directors in Cinema: A Worldwide Biographical Dictionary. McFarland, 1998.

External links

1893 births
1966 deaths
American art directors